The 2002 Worthing Borough Council election took place on 2 May 2002 to elect members of  Worthing Borough Council in West Sussex, England. One third of the council was up for election and the Liberal Democrats gained overall control of the council from the Conservative Party. Overall turnout was 30.67%.

After the previous election in 2000 the Conservatives had controlled the council with 20 seats compared to the Liberal Democrats 16. 12 seats were up for election in 2002 with the Liberal Democrats needing to gain 2 seats to make Worthing a hung council. Issues in the election included litter, the introduction of palm trees on the seafront and a recent 10.3% increase in council tax.

The results saw the Liberal Democrats make 3 gains from the Conservatives to take control. They gained all three of the seats they had been targeting in Castle, Gaisford and Selden wards. The Conservatives put their defeat down to a proposed Asda at Worthing College and on the recent increase in council tax which they blamed on the national government. The Liberal Democrats pledged to work for a "clean and safe Worthing". Following the election the Conservative mayor-elect, John Livermore, stepped down, refusing to serve as mayor with the Liberal Democrats in control of the council.

After the election, the composition of the council was:
Liberal Democrat 19
Conservative 17

Election result

Ward results

References

Worthing
2002
2000s in West Sussex